For the "two spaces" style of punctuation, see Sentence spacing.

Frank Black is the debut solo album by American alternative rock musician Frank Black. The album was recorded in 1992 and released on March 8, 1993 via 4AD and Elektra Records, after the breakup of Black's band the Pixies.

The album is similar in style, both musically and lyrically, to the Pixies' last album prior to their 1993 breakup, Trompe le Monde. Frank Black is characterized by a focus on UFOs and science fiction. Two singles from the album—"Los Angeles" and "Hang On to Your Ego"—were released in 1993; both reached the top ten of Billboards Modern Rock Tracks chart.

Recording and production
While the Pixies' 1991 album Trompe le Monde was being recorded, Black, known as Black Francis at the time, had discussions with the album's producer, Gil Norton, about a possible solo record. He told Norton he was keen to record again, even though he had no new material; as a result, the two decided on a covers album. However, by the time Francis visited a recording studio again in 1992, he had "plenty of tunes and musical scraps".

He collaborated with Eric Drew Feldman of Pere Ubu to record new material; they began by trimming down the number of covers to one, The Beach Boys' "Hang On to Your Ego". Feldman became the album's producer, and played keyboard and bass guitar on several songs, with former Pixies guitarist Joey Santiago on lead guitar. Francis recorded the album during the hiatus and breakup of the Pixies in late 1992 and early 1993. He then adopted the stage name "Frank Black" (inverting his old persona "Black Francis") and released the results as Frank Black in March 1993.

The song "I Heard Ramona Sing" is featured in the 2010 film Scott Pilgrim vs. the World, as well as its soundtrack.

Music

Frank Black is characterized by a lyrical focus on UFOs and science fiction, although he explored other eclectic subjects, such as in "I Heard Ramona Sing", a song about the Ramones. The album is similar in style, both musically and lyrically, to the Pixies' albums Bossanova and Trompe le Monde. Feldman later said that the first record connected his solo career with Trompe le Monde, "but at the same time it is an island, like nothing else he [Black] did".

Track listing

Notes

Personnel
 Frank Black – vocals, guitar
 Eric Drew Feldman – bass, keyboards, synthetics
 Nick Vincent – drums, percussion

Additional musicians
 Joey Santiago – additional guitar
 Dave Sardy – additional guitar
 Jeff Moris Tepper – additional guitar
 Bob Giusti – additional drums
 John Linnell – saxophone
 Kurt Hoffman – saxophone

Technical personnel
 Alistair Clay – engineer, mixing
 Efren Herrera – second engineer
 Matt Packuko – second engineer
 Sean Leonard – second engineer
 Wally Traugott – mastering
 Chris Bigg – design
 Vaughan Oliver – design
 Simon Larbalestier – artwork photography
 Michael Halsband – portrait photography

Charts

References

Bibliography

External links
 Lyrics and song notes at FrankBlack.net

1993 debut albums
4AD albums
Black Francis albums